Scolopocryptops is a genus of bark centipedes in the family Scolopocryptopidae. There are at least 20 described species in Scolopocryptops.

Species
These 22 species belong to the genus Scolopocryptops:

 Scolopocryptops aberrans Chamberlin (1920) c g
 Scolopocryptops aurantiaca Gervais 1847 c g
 Scolopocryptops capillepidatus Takakuwa (1938) c g
 Scolopocryptops capillipedatus (Takakuwa, 1938) g
 Scolopocryptops curtus Takakuwa (1939) c g
 Scolopocryptops denticulatus Bücherl (1946) c g
 Scolopocryptops ferrugineus Linnaeus 1767 c g
 Scolopocryptops gracilis Wood, 1862 c g b
 Scolopocryptops guacharensis Manfredi 1957 c g
 Scolopocryptops melanostomus Newport 1845 c g
 Scolopocryptops nigridius McNeill, 1887 c g b
 Scolopocryptops nigrimaculatus Song, Song & Zhu 2004 c g
 Scolopocryptops peregrinator Crabill (1952) c g
 Scolopocryptops piauhiensis Chagas 2004 c g
 Scolopocryptops quadrisulcatus Daday 1891 c g
 Scolopocryptops rubiginosus Koch, 1878 c g b
 Scolopocryptops sexspinosus Say (1821) c g b
 Scolopocryptops sexspinous (Say, 1821) g
 Scolopocryptops spinicaudus Wood, 1862 c g b
 Scolopocryptops spinulifer Bücherl (1949) c g
 Scolopocryptops verdescens Chamberlin (1921) c g
 Scolopocryptops viridis Gervais 1847 c g

Data sources: i = ITIS, c = Catalogue of Life, g = GBIF, b = Bugguide.net

References

Further reading

External links

 

Scolopendromorpha